Bob Stacey ( 1950-2022) was an Oregon attorney and leader in land use and transportation planning. On his death, Congressman Earl Blumenauer stated that "Oregon just lost the most important person that most people have never heard of". In a number of roles in state and local government, Stacey was instrumental in defining land use law and policy within the state of Oregon.

Early life  
A native of Portland, he graduated from Parkrose High School. He later earned a Bachelor's in political science from Reed College and a law degree from University of Oregon.

Early work in land use planning  
In the 1970s, Stacey was one of the original staff attorneys of 1000 Friends of Oregon, founded after the Oregon Land Conservation and Development Act of 1973 to advocate for state-wide land use planning. During this time, he was instrumental in arguing in favor of land use planning law such as the new urban growth boundary system to preserve farmland and combat suburban sprawl. 

Stacey also participated in legal action against Rajneeshpuram, which resulted in a suspected poisoning attempt against him and 1000 Friends of Oregon staff during the same period that Rajneeshees perpetrated a 1984 bioterror attack and 1985 assassination plot.

Political career 
Stacey later served as chief of staff to Blumenauer during his time in city office and in Congress, as well as serving as a senior policy advisor to Governor Barbara Roberts. He also was executive director for TriMet. Stacey went on to lead 1000 Friends of Oregon as Executive Director from 2002-2009. 

In 2012 Stacey was elected to Metro regional government, a planning body for the Portland metropolitan area. He stepped down from Metro in 2021 after battling meningioma. In 2021, a pedestrian and cyclist bridge in Portland was renamed the Bob Stacey Crossing in his honor. He died at home in Southeast Portland in 2022.

References 

1950 births
2022 deaths
Lawyers from Portland, Oregon
Land use in Oregon